Tleihat  is a Syrian village located in Al-Hamraa Nahiyah in Hama District, Hama.  According to the Syria Central Bureau of Statistics (CBS), Tleihat had a population of 1306 in the 2004 census.

References 

Populated places in Hama District